Aron "Ali" Bacher (born 24 May 1942) is a former South African Test cricket captain and an administrator of the United Cricket Board of South Africa.

Personal life
Bacher was born in May 1942 in Roodepoort to Lithuanian-Jewish parents who had migrated to South Africa. He got his nickname "Ali" at the age of seven from the story of Ali Baba. Bacher married Shira Teeger in 1965, and they have two daughters and one son. His nephew Adam Bacher played for South Africa in the 1990s.

He studied at the University of the Witwatersrand and became a general practitioner. He worked as a GP for nine years but left the field, saying, "I realised I was getting too emotionally involved with the patients." In 1979 he briefly went into a family business.

Cricket career
Bacher started playing cricket while at King Edward VII School in Johannesburg, and represented Transvaal at the age of 17. He was appointed captain of Transvaal for the 1963–64 season, in place of John Waite, who was on tour with the South African national side in Australia.  He played in 12 Tests for South Africa, three against England and nine against Australia; he was captain in the last four. In a first-class match for Transvaal against the visiting Australian cricket team in 1966–67, he made 235 in the second innings, the record score for any South African team against Australia, took five catches, and led his team to Australia's first ever defeat in South Africa. He later played important innings in Test victories over Australia in the First, Third and Fifth Tests.

He captained the national team in only one series: in 1969–70 against Australia at home, in which the South Africans won all four Tests. He was selected to captain the touring teams to England in 1970 and Australia in 1971–72, but neither tour eventuated, owing to anti-apartheid protests in the host countries. In 1972 he became the first player to make 5000 runs in the Currie Cup. He was awarded South Africa's Sports Merit Award (its top athletics honour) in 1972.

Administrative career
In 1981 Bacher had heart bypass surgery, then took up the job of leading Transvaal's newly professionalised cricket administration. He was made managing director of the South African Cricket Union in the late 1980s.

Believing that apartheid would not end in his lifetime, and determined to maintain the vigour of South African cricket, he encouraged tours by "rebel" teams from Sri Lanka, England, West Indies and Australia during the 1980s. At the same time he recognised that South African cricket had no long-term future unless cricketers in the non-white communities were encouraged to develop their potential, and he organised mass coaching clinics and development programs in the black townships.

When apartheid began to collapse in 1990, Bacher immediately set out to form one body to oversee all cricket in South Africa: he contacted Steve Tshwete, the head of the ANC's sports desk, to help get the parties to agree on a unified body. Tshwete soon forged an agreement and the two men became friends, travelling to London together in 1991 to successfully apply for South Africa's re-admission to the International Cricket Council.

Bacher managed the South African team on its brief tour of India in 1991. He instigated cricket's first video-review system in 1992 and directed the planning for the 2003 Cricket World Cup.

In 2005 he joined the board of the South African Rugby Union as the sponsors' representative.

See also
List of select Jewish cricketers

References

External links

Cricketfundas.com's Interview of Ali Bacher
"You can't be taught to inspire people. You have to be born a captain" interview with Ali Bacher at Cricinfo

1942 births
Living people
Sportspeople from Johannesburg
Jewish cricketers
South Africa Test cricket captains
20th-century South African physicians
South African people of Lithuanian-Jewish descent
South African cricket administrators
Jewish South African sportspeople
Gauteng cricketers
Alumni of King Edward VII School (Johannesburg)
International Jewish Sports Hall of Fame inductees